Caina micrella is a species of snout moth described by Émile Louis Ragonot in 1893. It is found in North Africa, including Algeria.

References

Moths described in 1893
Phycitinae
Taxa named by Émile Louis Ragonot